The MX-1 is a Philippine Armored personnel carrier (APC) developed by Steelcraft Industrial & Development Corporation.

Development
The MX-1 is a fire support vehicle developed by Steelcraft Industrial & Development Corporation in the Philippines. Its development is derived from the Hari-Digma APC also designed by Steelcraft. It is the second of the four vehicles developed by Steelcraft.

Armament
Being a fire support vehicle, the MX-1 needed to have adequate firepower, so Steelcraft designed a unique Three-Weapon Turret System and a rear cupola for the MX-1's use. The Three-Weapon Turret System consists of a .50 cal machine gun, a 7.62mm multipurpose MG and a 40mm Automatic Grenade Launcher for extra punch. The rear cupola houses another 7.62mm multipurpose machine gun for rear coverage. This gives the MX-1 four weapons to bring against different types of targets, giving it flexibility in various engagements.

Armor
Information has not been released by the Philippine government.

Engine
The MX-1 uses a Cummins diesel in-line 6-cylinder engine. The engine produces  and gives the MX-1 a maximum speed of 120 km/h (75 mph). The Cummins engine was chosen for its robustness and reliability, both very important in the jungle terrain of the Philippines.

Deployment capability
The MX-1 has two side doors and one rear door for fast deployment. Tested against the one-doored Simba (APC), results showed 150% faster deployment time on exiting the vehicle. This rapid deployment was promoted as one of the strengths of the MX-1.

Variants
 None. Only one prototype was created.

Related development
 MX-8 Armored Escort Vehicle
 MX-7 Gagamba
 Simba (APC)

Users

Philippine Army- One prototype only. Never entered service.

References
Source:
Phildefencetechblog

Armoured cars
Fire support vehicles
Armored fighting vehicles of the Philippines